Alhaji Bomba Jawara is a Sierra Leonean politician from the opposition Sierra Leone People's Party (SLPP) and he is currently a member of parliament representing Koinadugu District. He is from the Mandingo ethnic group.

External links
https://web.archive.org/web/20081010024540/http://parliamentsl.org/members.htm

Year of birth missing (living people)
Living people
Members of the Parliament of Sierra Leone
Sierra Leone People's Party politicians
Sierra Leonean Mandingo people
People from Koinadugu District
Place of birth missing (living people)